Le Piolit is a 2,464 m mountain in the Dauphiné Alps close to the cities of Gap and Ancelle in the département of Hautes-Alpes in France.

Mountains of Hautes-Alpes
Mountains of the Alps